The Best of Hanoi Rocks is the first compilation album by the Finnish rock band Hanoi Rocks. The record was released in 1985, the same year the original Hanoi Rocks broke up. The band's founders, vocalist Michael Monroe and guitarist Andy McCoy, would ultimately reunite in 2001 and reform Hanoi Rocks, until the band's final break-up in 2009.

Track listing

Personnel
Hanoi Rocks
Michael Monroe -  lead vocals, saxophone, harmonica
Andy McCoy - lead guitar, backing vocals
Nasty Suicide - rhythm guitar, backing vocals
Sam Yaffa - bass
Gyp Casino - drums (Tracks: 4, 5, 7, 8, 12, 13, bonus tracks)
Razzle - drums (Tracks: 1, 2, 3, 6, 9, 10, 11)
with:
Morgan Fisher - keyboards (Tracks: 3, 9, 10)
Miriam Stockley - backing vocals (Tracks: 9)

Chart positions

Album

References

Hanoi Rocks albums
1985 compilation albums